SSG may refer to:

Organizations 
 Chief of Naval Operations Strategic Studies Group, US
 Safesoft Global, later Seioglobal, a Chinese IT company
 Särskilda Skyddsgruppen, a Swedish special forces unit
 Shinsegae, a South Korean company
 Special Service Group, a Pakistani special forces unit
 Special Surveillance Group of the US FBI
 Strategic Studies Group, an Australian wargame software company
 Subaltern Studies Group, studying post-colonial societies
 Syrian Salvation Government, a separatist group involved in the Syrian Civil War

Sniper rifles
German initials for Scharfschützengewehr (sharpshooter or sniper rifle)
 Steyr SSG 69, Austria, 1969
 SSG 82, East Germany, 1982
 SIG Sauer SSG 2000, Swiss/German, 1989
 SIG Sauer SSG 3000, Swiss/German, 1992
 Steyr SSG 04, Austria, 2004
 Steyr SSG 08, Austria, 2008

Other uses 
 Super saugut
 L'Entente SSG, a French association football team
 Security sector governance, a sub-concept of governance
 Seimat language, ISO 639-3 language code
 Server supported gaming, gambling technology
 Software-controlled Sound Generator, Yamaha YM2149F version of General Instrument AY-3-8910 IC
 US Navy hull classification for cruise missile submarines
 Staff sergeant
 SuperSmart Grid, proposed international electricity grid
 Static site generator, web template systems which produce static web pages.
 Abbreviation for Swiss Standard German
 Symbolic Stream Generator, Unisys software 
 The IATA code for Malabo International Airport
Structural Silicone Glazing, a type of glazing used in Curtain wall (architecture)
Stade Saint-Germain, a French association football club
 SSG Landers, a South Korean baseball club
 Stock Selection Guide, a stock analysis tool originally developed in the 1950s